Javier Salinas Narváez (born 22 November 1965) is a Mexican politician affiliated with the PRD. As of 2013 he served as Deputy of both the LIX and LXII Legislatures of the Mexican Congress representing the State of Mexico.

References

1965 births
Living people
Politicians from the State of Mexico
Party of the Democratic Revolution politicians
20th-century Mexican politicians
21st-century Mexican politicians
Members of the Congress of the State of Mexico
Autonomous University of Mexico State alumni
Universidad Anáhuac México alumni
Deputies of the LXII Legislature of Mexico
Members of the Chamber of Deputies (Mexico) for the State of Mexico